John Young (21 December 1930 – 3 November 2011) was a Scottish Conservative Party politician. He served as a Member of the Scottish Parliament (MSP) for the West of Scotland region from 1999 to 2003.

Early life 

Young was in December 1930 in Glasgow, where he attended Hillhead High School before enrolling in the Scottish College of Commerce. He also studied a management course at Glasgow University.

Local politics 

Having originally been elected as a councillor in Glasgow in 1961, Young became leader of Glasgow District Council in 1977, a role he held until 1980.

Scottish Parliament 

Young was elected as an MSP for the West of Scotland region in 1999. At the time of his election he was 69, making him the second oldest MSP after Winnie Ewing of the Scottish National Party.

In the Scottish Parliament he was the Conservative group's Deputy Spokesman on Transport and Environment and was a member of the Scottish Parliamentary Corporate Body. He retired at the 2003 election.

Personal life 

Young died after a long illness in November 2011 at the age of 80. He was predeceased by his wife Doris and survived by one son, Peter.

References

External links 
 
 Herald obituary
 Scotsman obituary

1930 births
2011 deaths
Conservative MSPs
Councillors in Glasgow
Members of the Scottish Parliament 1999–2003
People educated at Hillhead High School
Scottish Conservative Party councillors
Leaders of local authorities of Scotland